St Francis Ladies Football Club is an Irish association football club based in Baldonnel, Dublin. It is the women's section of St Francis F.C. They have entered teams in both the FAI Women's Cup and the Dublin Women's Soccer League. They also represented the Republic of Ireland in the 2009–10 and 2010–11 UEFA Women's Champions Leagues.

History
In 2008 and 2009 with a squad that included Mary Waldron, Grainne Kierans and Megan Campbell,  St Francis won two successive FAI Women's Cup/Dublin Women's Soccer League doubles. In the 2008 FAI Women's Cup final, Waldron hit an injury–time winner from the penalty spot as St  Francis beat Peamount United 2–1 at Richmond Park. In the 2009 FAI Women's Cup final St Francis defeated St Catherine's 1–0. They also retained the Dublin Women's Soccer League title and won the 2009 DWSL Premier Cup.

St Francis in Europe

2009–10 UEFA Women's Champions League
After winning the 2008 FAI Women's Cup, St Francis qualified for the 2009–10 UEFA Women's Champions League. All of the group matches were played in Cyprus at the Tsirion Stadium and the Pafiako Stadium. St Francis lost all three matches in the tournament. Veteran Republic of Ireland,  international Grainne Kierans highlighted the gap in funding with their opponents. Kierans observed that "one of the teams had a budget of €700,000 to €1 million, whereas we had to raise the money ourselves to go there".

Group F

2010–11 UEFA Women's Champions League
After winning the 2009 FAI Women's Cup, St Francis qualified for the 2010–11 UEFA Women's Champions League. Their group matches were played in Croatia at the Stadion Gradski vrt and at the Stadion HNK Cibalia. St Francis' squad included among others, Megan Campbell, Kelly Jones and Cheryl Foster. The latter two were both on loan from Liverpool L.F.C. After winning their opening game 4–1 against 1º Dezembro, St Francis lost their second game 9–0 to Rossiyanka. However St Francis secured second place in the tournament with a 5–3 win against the hosts, Osijek, despite being 3–0 down at half-time.

Group 6

Notable former players

Republic of Ireland women's internationals
  Megan Campbell
  Sonya Hughes
  Grainne Kierans
  Katie McCabe
  Grace Murray
  Mary Waldron

Wales women's internationals
   Cheryl Foster

Honours
FAI Women's Cup
Winners: 2008, 2009: 2
Dublin Women's Soccer League
Winners: 2008, 2009: 2
DWSL Premier Cup
Winners: 2009: 1

References

Ladies
Association football clubs in South Dublin (county)
Association football clubs established in 2006
2006 establishments in Ireland
Women's association football clubs in the Republic of Ireland
Dublin Women's Soccer League teams